Dictyna ignobilis is spider species found in Moldavia and Armenia.

See also 
 List of Dictynidae species

References 

Dictynidae
Spiders of Europe
Fauna of Armenia
Spiders described in 1895